Du Layna or Duleena is a district in Ghor province, Afghanistan. It was created from part of the much larger Chaghcharan District in 2005.

References

External links 
 Map of Settlements IMMAP, September 2011

Districts of Ghor Province